The River Ekulu is a  long river and the largest body of water in the city of Enugu in Enugu State, southeastern Nigeria, and it originates in the same city as well.

References

Rivers of Nigeria
Enugu